Can Bartu (31 January 1936 – 11 April 2019) was a Turkish basketball and football player of Circassian origin. He was the first Turkish footballer to play a final in Europe. His statue was erected in Istanbul. After retirement, he also worked as a pundit and sports journalist.

Personal life
Bartu was considered a "legendary" footballer, and was nicknamed the "Sinyor" (from Italian "Signor" for nobleman).

After his retirement, he wrote columns long time for the daily Hürriyet.

Can Bartu died at the age of 83 on 11 April 2019. He was interred at the Karacaahmet Cemetery following a memorial ceremony held at the Şükrü Saracoğlu Stadium, the home ground of Fenerbahçe S.K., and the religious funeral at the Marmara İlahiyat Mosque in Üsküdar.

Career 
He started to play basketball for Fenerbahçe and was a six-time international representative with the national basketball team. He was invited by the football coach Fikret Arıcan to play football beside basketball. On 25 January 1957, Bartu played football for his club against Beyoğluspor. He scored two goals and assisted for two more. He helped so his team won 4–0. Then, that evening, Bartu played basketball for Fenerbahçe, scoring 10 points. He helped his club win 44–43 shooting a goal three seconds before the finish. Bartu switched then over to football in his club. He played 26 times for the Turkish national football team.

In 1961, Bartu transferred to ACF Fiorentina in Italy. Later, he played for Venezia A.C. in 1962 and for S.S. Lazio in 1964. He is the first ever Turkish footballer, who played a final game in Europe with Fiorentina against Atlético Madrid in 1962.  He was nicknamed "Signor" by the Italians due to his technique and gentile manner on the playground and because of his chic outfits worn off field.

After successful seasons in Italy, Bartu returned to Turkey in 1967 to play in his former club Fenerbahçe for more three years. Overall, Bartu played 326 games with Fenerbahçe and scored 162 goals. He became four-time Turkish Super League champion in 1959, 1961, 1968 and 1970 with Fenerbahçe.

He retired from active sport in 1970 and continued his career as a sports journalist writing for the newspaper Hürriyet.
 
He also took part on a national TV channel in Turkey as a commentator.

Bartu was the UEFA Cup ambassador of Turkey in 2008/2009 season, when the Şükrü Saracoğlu Stadium in Istanbul hosted the final.

Bartu replaced the injured Turgay Şeren at 77' and played as a goalkeeper against Romania on 2 November 1958 in București during a European Cup game.

Career statistics

International goals

Legacy
The current training facilities of the Fenerbahçe senior football team are named after Bartu.

References

1936 births
Turkish people of Circassian descent
Turkish men's basketball players
Fenerbahçe men's basketball players
Turkish footballers
Association football wingers
Turkey international footballers
Fenerbahçe S.K. footballers
ACF Fiorentina players
Venezia F.C. players
S.S. Lazio players
Serie A players
Expatriate footballers in Italy
Turkish expatriate sportspeople in Italy
Turkish expatriate footballers
Turkish sports journalists
Turkish columnists
Hürriyet people
2019 deaths
Burials at Karacaahmet Cemetery